2022 Kharkiv bombing may refer to:

 February 2022 Kharkiv cluster bombing
 Kharkiv government building airstrike
 March 2022 Kharkiv cluster bombing
 April 2022 Kharkiv cluster bombing